The All Saints School is a historic private school in Sioux Falls, South Dakota. William Hobart Hare, the first Episcopal bishop of South Dakota, founded the school to serve as a girls' boarding school for the children of Episcopal missionaries. The school's main building, a four-story granite Prairie Gothic structure with a distinctive bell tower, was built in 1884. A cupola sits atop the building's front entrance; Hare's personal quarters was near the cupola, and he was known to watch the city from the cupola in the evening. A -story chapel is located on the west side of the main building.

The school's main building was listed on the National Register of Historic Places in 1973. It is also part of the All Saints Historic District.

References

School buildings on the National Register of Historic Places in South Dakota
National Register of Historic Places in Sioux Falls, South Dakota
1884 establishments in Dakota Territory
School buildings completed in 1884
Educational institutions established in 1884
Schools in Minnehaha County, South Dakota
Education in Sioux Falls, South Dakota